Åke Anders Edvard Wallenquist (January 16, 1904 – April 8, 1994) was a Swedish astronomer. He worked at the Dutch Bosscha Observatory in Indonesia between 1928 and 1935, and became assistant professor at Uppsala's Kvistabergs Observatorium (Kvistaberg Observatory) in 1948. He worked originally on double stars but it was the open star clusters and their properties that became his main area of research. Wallenquist was a very active member of both the Royal Swedish Academy of Sciences in Stockholm and the Royal Swedish Society of Sciences in Uppsala. From the 1950s onwards, he was the leading writer of popular astronomy in Sweden among the professional astronomers. His books inspired generations of young people to become interested in astronomy.

Asteroid 2114 Wallenquist was named in his honour.

References

External links 
 Åke Wallenquist (1904-1994)

1904 births
1994 deaths
20th-century Swedish astronomers
Discoverers of asteroids
Members of the Royal Swedish Academy of Sciences